Liben may refer to:

Liben, East Shewa, Oromia, a woreda in Ethiopia
Liben, Guji, Oromia, a woreda in Ethiopia
Liben Zone in the Somali Region of Ethiopia
 Liben, Somali, a woreda in the Liben Zone
Libeň, Cadastral area and district of Prague
Liben, taxonomic abbreviation for the botanist Louis Liben (1926–2006)

See also
Liban (disambiguation)